Misako Konno (紺野 美沙子 Konno Misako), born Misako Shinoda (篠田 美佐子 Shinoda Misako, born September 8, 1960) is a Japanese actress and essayist.

Her maiden name is Misako Satō (佐藤美佐子 Satō Misako).

Filmography

Film

Television

Awards

References

External links
Official site 

JMDb profile 

Japanese actresses
1960 births
Living people
Japanese essayists
Keio University alumni
Asadora lead actors